Mount Patah (means: Broken Mountain) is the highest mountain in the Indonesian  province of Bengkulu, it is a heavily forested quaternary age volcano southeast of Mount Dempo on Sumatra island, Indonesia. On 1 May 1989, a fumarole activity was observed by a pilot near the summit. The exact location of the crater, the date of its formation and its geologic relationship is uncertain.

Mount Patah is in a protected forest area RajaMandara, with a total area of 42.567 hectares. The peak of the mountain is located on the border of the province of Bengkulu and South Sumatra with a height of 2,852 meters above sea level, in the western part there is a crater sulfur which is located into the region of Bengkulu province at an altitude of 2,600 meters above sea level, in the southern part of the crater there is a volcanic lake with an altitude of 2,550 meters above sea level.

A picture of the crater of Mount Patah

See also 

 List of volcanoes in Indonesia

References 

Volcanoes of Sumatra
Active volcanoes of Indonesia
Stratovolcanoes of Indonesia
Mountains of Sumatra